Joseph Lafaele Tuipala (born September 13, 1976) is a former American football linebacker. He is the nephew of former New England Patriots running back Mosi Tatupu, and first cousin of Seattle Seahawks linebacker Lofa Tatupu. He played two seasons in the National Football League, with the Jacksonville Jaguars. He was also a member of the New Orleans Saints and Washington Redskins, including assignments to various NFL Europe teams.

Born in Honolulu, Hawaii, he is of Samoan descent. Tuipala is the son of Tautofi Tuipala (Father) and Maude "Moki" Scanlan (Mother) both from American Samoa. Tuipala attended Sherman E. Burroughs High School in Ridgecrest, California. He went on to play college football at San Diego State, and was named Defensive MVP of the 1998 Las Vegas Bowl.

References

External links
Las Vegas Outlaws bio

1976 births
Living people
American sportspeople of Samoan descent
American football linebackers
Players of American football from Honolulu
Players of Canadian football from Honolulu
San Diego State Aztecs football players
Jacksonville Jaguars players
Cologne Centurions (NFL Europe) players
Barcelona Dragons players
Winnipeg Blue Bombers players
Las Vegas Outlaws (XFL) players